Warrensburg is a village in Macon County, Illinois, United States. Its population was 1,110 at the 2020 census, down from 1,201 in 2010. It is included in the Decatur, Illinois Metropolitan Statistical Area. Warrensburg was established in 1841.

Geography
Warrensburg is located in northwestern Decatur County at  (39.931102, -89.061326). Illinois Route 121 passes through the northeast side of the village, leading southeast  to Decatur, the county seat, and northwest  to Mount Pulaski.

Demographics

As of the census of 2000, there were 1,289 people, 500 households, and 364 families residing in the village. The racial makeup of the village was 97.67% White, 0.62% African American, 0.31% Native American, 0.23% Asian, 0.08% from other races, and 1.09% from two or more races. Hispanic or Latino of any race were 0.47% of the population.

There were 500 households, out of which 35.8% had children under the age of 18 living with them, 58.6% were married couples living together, 10.2% had a female householder with no husband present, and 27.2% were non-families. 22.4% of all households were made up of individuals, and 7.8% had someone living alone who was 65 years of age or older. The average household size was 2.56 and the average family size was 3.03.

In the village, the population was spread out, with 27.0% under the age of 18, 8.2% from 18 to 24, 31.1% from 25 to 44, 25.0% from 45 to 64, and 8.7% who were 65 years of age or older. The median age was 35 years. For every 100 females, there were 95.0 males. For every 100 females age 18 and over, there were 97.3 males.

The median income for a household in the village was $45,708, and the median income for a family was $51,458. Males had a median income of $40,341 versus $22,688 for females. The per capita income for the village was $19,041. About 2.4% of families and 3.7% of the population were below the poverty line, including 3.5% of those under age 18 and 2.2% of those age 65 or over.

Notable people
 John L. Rotz, Hall of Fame jockey, winner of 1970 Belmont Stakes
 Margie Wright, softball coach and Hall of Famer

References

External links

Villages in Macon County, Illinois
Villages in Illinois
Populated places established in 1841
1841 establishments in Illinois